Vasyl Bilyi (born 13 March 1990) is a professional Ukrainian football defender. He played in the different Ukrainian clubs in the Ukrainian First League and the Ukrainian Second League and in 2017 signed one-year deal with FC Rukh Vynnyky.

Career 
Vasyl Bilyi started playing for FC Lviv, for which he played 13 matches without goals.

In 2010 he moved to Stryi to the local FC Skala where he played 3 seasons, had 45 matches and scored 3 goals.

In the 2012-2013 season he moved to the second league Unity from the village of Plysky in which he scored 3 goals in 15 matches.

In the winter season of 2012-2013, the coach of Ternopil's Niva, Igor Yavorskyi, liked the game of Bilyi and he transferred to the Ternopil team for an open transfer window, for which he played 23 matches.

In June 2016, he became a Veres player.

In June 2017, he joined Rukh from Vynnyk, signing a one-year contract.

At the end of August 2018, he and his brother left Rukh as a free agent.

On September 2, 2018, he became a player of Lviv again, signing a one-year contract.

Family 
His older brother Ivan Bilyi is also a professional football player.

References

External links
 
 

1990 births
Living people
People from Truskavets
Ukrainian footballers
Ukrainian expatriate footballers
Expatriate footballers in Kazakhstan
Ukrainian expatriate sportspeople in Kazakhstan
FC Lviv players
FC Lviv-2 players
FC Skala Stryi (2004) players
FC Yednist Plysky players
FC Nyva Ternopil players
Association football defenders
FC Stal Kamianske players
FC Naftovyk-Ukrnafta Okhtyrka players
NK Veres Rivne players
FC Rukh Lviv players
FC Altai Semey players
FC Obolon-Brovar Kyiv players
FC Viktoriya Mykolaivka players
Sportspeople from Lviv Oblast